The Świętokrzyskie Voivodeship Sejmik is the regional legislature of the voivodeship of Świętokrzyskie, Poland. It is a unicameral body consists of thirty councillors elected in free elections for a five-year term. The current chairperson of the assembly is Andrzej Pruś of the PiS.

The assembly elects the executive board that acts as the collective executive for the regional government, headed by the province's marshal. The current Executive Board of Świętokrzyskie is held by the Law and Justice with Andrzej Bętkowski presiding as marshal.

The Regional Assembly meets in the Marshal's Office in Kielce.

Districts 

Members of the Assembly are elected from five districts, serve five-year terms. Districts does not have the constituencies formal names. Instead, each constituency has a number and territorial description.

See also 
 Polish Regional Assembly
 Świętokrzyskie Voivodeship

External links 
 (pl) Świętokrzyskie Regional Assembly

References

Voivodeship assemblies in Poland
Assembly
Unicameral legislatures